Feather Sound is a census-designated place (CDP) in Pinellas County, Florida, United States. The population was 3,420 at the 2010 census. It includes the St. Petersburg-Clearwater International Airport.

Geography
Feather Sound is located at  (27.904972, -82.673552).

Demographics

As of the census of 2000, there were 3,597 people, 1,909 households, and 943 families residing in the CDP.  The population density was 329.9/km2 (854.1/mi2).  There were 2,027 housing units at an average density of 185.9/km2 (481.3/mi2).  The racial makeup of the CDP was 93.86% White, 2.09% African American, 0.11% Native American, 2.53% Asian, 0.03% Pacific Islander, 0.67% from other races, and 0.72% from two or more races. Hispanic or Latino of any race were 4.06% of the population.

There were 1,909 households, out of which 15.6% had children under the age of 18 living with them, 42.9% were married couples living together, 4.5% had a female householder with no husband present, and 50.6% were non-families. 40.1% of all households were made up of individuals, and 4.1% had someone living alone who was 65 years of age or older.  The average household size was 1.88 and the average family size was 2.54.

In the CDP, the population was spread out, with 13.5% under the age of 18, 6.2% from 18 to 24, 41.6% from 25 to 44, 29.9% from 45 to 64, and 8.9% who were 65 years of age or older.  The median age was 39 years. For every 100 females, there were 100.1 males.  For every 100 females age 18 and over, there were 99.0 males.

The median income for a household in the CDP was $71,310, and the median income for a family was $92,181. Males had a median income of $55,167 versus $40,781 for females. The per capita income for the CDP was $49,717.  About 0.8% of families and 2.2% of the population were below the poverty line, including none of those under age 18 and 5.3% of those age 65 or over.

References

Unincorporated communities in Pinellas County, Florida
Census-designated places in Pinellas County, Florida
Census-designated places in Florida
Unincorporated communities in Florida
Populated places on Tampa Bay